Jonas Carls (born 25 March 1997) is a German professional footballer who plays as a left-back for SC Paderborn.

Career
Carls made his professional debut for Schalke 04 in the Bundesliga on 20 April 2019, starting in the home match against 1899 Hoffenheim.

Career statistics

References

External links
 
 
 

1997 births
Living people
People from Haan
Sportspeople from Düsseldorf (region)
Footballers from North Rhine-Westphalia
German footballers
Association football fullbacks
Bundesliga players
2. Bundesliga players
3. Liga players
Regionalliga players
Primeira Liga players
1. FC Nürnberg II players
FC Schalke 04 II players
FC Schalke 04 players
FC Viktoria Köln players
Vitória S.C. players
SC Paderborn 07 players
German expatriate footballers
German expatriate sportspeople in Portugal
Expatriate footballers in Portugal